Netherton railway station served the town of Netherton, Dudley, England, from 1852 to 1878 on the Oxford, Worcester and Wolverhampton Railway.

History
The station was opened on 20 December 1852 by the Great Western Railway. It was situated southwest of New Road. Nothing remains.

References

Disused railway stations in Dudley
Former Great Western Railway stations
Railway stations in Great Britain opened in 1852
Railway stations in Great Britain closed in 1878
1852 establishments in England
1878 disestablishments in England